= Time brokerage agreement =

A time brokerage agreement can refer to instances of a third-party paying a broadcast station to air specific programs, with the airtime usually controlled in its entirety by the program's producer.

- Brokered programming, for specific programs.
- Local marketing agreement, a blanket term for a family of agreements that involve leases of a station's entire operations.
